Thomas Raymond Robson (11 August 1928 – January 2014) was an English professional footballer who played as a full-back. He made 68 appearances in the Football League playing for Bradford City and Grimsby Town.

References

1928 births
2014 deaths
Footballers from Newcastle upon Tyne
English footballers
Association football fullbacks
Cardiff City F.C. players
Bradford City A.F.C. players
Grimsby Town F.C. players
South Shields F.C. (1936) players
English Football League players